Taptu was a social media and technology company that built platforms, tools and applications that enabled content on touch screen mobile devices, including phones running iOS and Android. Taptu was a privately held company that was founded in Cambridge in 2007 and was funded by DFJ Esprit and Sofinnova. The company was based in Cambridge and Denver, Colorado.

In September 2012, Taptu was acquired by Mediafed Ltd. The Taptu service shut down March 31, 2015, a year before Mediafed went into administration.

Products

Original product
Taptu's first product was a mobile search engine, provided as a website using html optimised for phones, and dedicated apps for iPhone and Android. It was closed in early 2011.

My Taptu
Its other product was My Taptu, a social news aggregator that drew heavily on the company’s mobile search heritage but attempts to move them beyond search. According to Taptu, the app, which was available on the iPhone and Android devices, was "aimed at solving information overload," or what Taptu calls "app hopping." It presented all the information that a person "is into" in a "one- stop app" through "streams," or what CNET described as “content playlists.” My Taptu tried to separate itself in the social news space by offering ways of personalization.

Recognition and awards

 Overall Mobile Search Company of the Year, Mobile Search Awards, September 2008
 Best Search Provider 2008, Mobile Entertainment Awards
 Commercial Category, MEX Design Competition
 Red Herring Top 100 European Tech Startups, April 2008 
 Global Community Award, MobileMonday Peer Awards, February 2008
 Meffys 2010, Winner of Content Discovery and Personalisation Award
 TechCrunch Europas 2010, Highly Commended in the category of Best Mobile Start Up

References

Defunct internet search engines
Companies based in Cambridge
Mobile technology